Victor Rowen (July 24, 1919 – January 14, 2013) was an American football, basketball, and  baseball coach.  He served as the head football coach at Defiance College from 1951 to 1953 and at San Francisco State University from 1961 to 1989, compiling a career college football record of 132–173–10.  His tenure of 28 years as head coach San Francisco State spanned over half of the length of time college football was played at the school.  Rowen was also the head basketball coach at Defiance from 1951 to 1954 at and San Francisco State for a season in 1957–58, tallying a career college basketball mark of 54–34.

Early years
Born Brooklyn, New York, Rowen played college football at Long Island University, and later went on to earn a doctorate in physical education from Columbia University.  Rowen got his start as a college coach at Ohio's Defiance College in 1951.  He joined San Francisco State as an assistant coach in 1954 under Joe Verducci, until becoming head coach in 1961.

San Francisco State
In Rowen's first years with the program, San Francisco State was a west-coast small college football powerhouse, winning eight Far Western Conference titles before 1967. This early success lead his team to attract a great deal of football talent to the university and San Francisco State was well known for its football during this time. All of that changed during the student strike of 1968, which crippled football at SFSU.

San Francisco State did not have a winning season between 1973 and when the program was cancelled in 1995. While noted for producing outstanding players and coaches who would go on to win with other programs, San Francisco State football under Rowen's later years was not as successful as other Division II college football teams.

Rowen was also the president of the American Football Coaches Association in 1986.

Family
Rowen's son, Keith Rowen, coached in the National Football League (NFL) with various teams for over 25 years.

Death
Rowen died January 14, 2013, aged 93.

Head coaching record

College football

References

1919 births
2013 deaths
Defiance Yellow Jackets baseball coaches
Defiance Yellow Jackets football coaches
Defiance Yellow Jackets men's basketball coaches
San Francisco State Gators football coaches
San Francisco State Gators men's basketball coaches
High school football coaches in New York (state)
Columbia University alumni
Long Island Blackbirds football players
United States Army personnel of World War II
Basketball coaches from New York (state)
United States Army soldiers
Sportspeople from Brooklyn
Players of American football from New York City